Kaliro is a town in the Eastern Region of Uganda. It is the main municipal, administrative, and commercial center of Kaliro District and the site of the district headquarters.

Location
The coordinates of the town are 0°53'42.0"N, 33°30'18.0"E (Latitude:0.8950; Longitude:33.5050).

Population
In 2002, the national population census estimated the town's population at 39,900. In 2010, the Uganda Bureau of Statistics (UBOS) estimated the population at 13,300. In 2011, UBOS estimated the population at 13,700. In 2014, the national census put the population at 16,796.

Administration
Kaliro is led by an elected mayor and elected town council. As of 2017, the mayor is Sam Gamutambuli.

Points of interest
The following points of interest lie within the town or close to its borders:

The palace was built in 1930.
The site is believed to have been the settlement of the first Lamogi (Chief) from the Babiito rulers of the Biito Dynasty of Bunyoro.
 offices of Kaliro Town Council
 Kaliro central market
 National Teachers' College Kaliro, one of the five government teacher training institutions for secondary school teachers.

See also
 Kyabazinga
 Henry Wako Muloki
 Busoga sub-region
 List of cities and towns in Uganda

References

External links
 Kaliro to Demonstrate Over Garbage

Kaliro District
Busoga
Populated places in Eastern Region, Uganda
Cities in the Great Rift Valley